Dipteroides is an extinct genus of lungfish which lived during the Devonian period.

References 

Prehistoric lungfish genera
Devonian bony fish